Rai Bahadur Sir Badridas Goenka CIE (29 July 1883 – 26 February 1973) was an Indian industrialist and business tycoon who served as the Chairman of the Imperial Bank of India from 1933 to 1955 and the first Chairman of the State Bank of India upon its formation in 1955.

Early life and education 

Badridas Goenka was born on 29 July 1883 in Calcutta to Ramachandra Goenka. The Goenkas were a Marwari family which hailed from Dundlod in Rajputana. His elder brother was Hariram Goenka and younger brother was Ghanshyam Das Goenka. In 1905, Badridas graduated from the Presidency College, Calcutta - he was the first Marwari to graduate. In college, Badridas developed an interest in physics and chemistry. He married Manorama in 1899.

Career 

Badridas joined the family business after graduation and was in 1910, elected Secretary of the Marwari Association. In 1923, Badridas was nominated over his rival G. D. Birla to the Marwari reserved seat in the Imperial Legislative Council of India. This resulted in an uncompromising political rivalry between the two. However, in 1930, Goenka declined an offer to be a part of the Viceroy's executive council.

In 1928, Badridas was part of the Hilton-Young Commission which investigated the financial situation in India. In 1930, he was appointed a director of the Imperial Bank of India and in 1933, he became Chairman, the first Indian to hold the post. He was elected for a second term in 1941 and subsequently, served till 1955, when the Imperial Bank of India was nationalized and became the State Bank of India. Badridas served as the first Chairman of the State Bank of India from 1955 to 1957.

Later life 

Badridas patched up with his old opponent G. D. Birla in the early 1940s and joined his Federation of Indian Chambers of Commerce and Industry of which Badridas became President in 1945. During the Bengal Famine, the two worked together to provide relief measures in the affected areas. When his term as President of FICCI came to an end, Badridas retired from all business and voluntary associations.

In his later years, Badridas increasingly transferred his responsibilities to his son K. P. Goenka. Badridas died on 26 February 1973. His death was mourned at a special meeting of the prominent citizens of Calcutta.

References

External links 
 

1883 births
1973 deaths
Businesspeople awarded knighthoods
Companions of the Order of the Indian Empire
Knights Bachelor
Indian Knights Bachelor
Presidency University, Kolkata alumni
Goenka Family
Rai Bahadurs